The Daniel Dean Trial of Scott County, Virginia was a trial that took place in the town of Estiville (Gate City), Virginia in July 1877. What makes this trial unique is that it was the first and only time that an individual was convicted of murder in the state of Virginia based solely on circumstantial evidence.

History
On June 25, 1877, Henry Fugate was found shot in the back on his farm while plowing his fields. The farm was between Nickelsville and Estillville (Gate City) Virginia.  Relatives heard the shot, and saw Fugate's plow horse galloping across the field. They found Fugate lying in the field. He was conscious long enough to tell them that he had been shot from the tree line that bordered the field.   Although the wound was fatal, he lived for two days, but was unable to be revived. Suspicion fell on a neighbor that lived no more than a half mile away, Daniel Dean. Several months before, he and Fugate had a falling-out, when Henry Fugate and his father were going to testify in a perjury case against Dean in July. Dean was arrested, but before he could be taken to Estillville jail, he escaped and attempted to make a run into the mountains. He was then captured and taken straight to the Estillville jail to await trail.  Because he tried to escape, many of Dean's neighbors believed him guilty.  Why else would he make a run for it unless he was guilty?  He was represented by the best defense attorney at the time, Patrick Hagan, who founded the town of Dungannon, Virginia. Patrick Hagan felt that Daniel was so innocent that he refused to work for any money.

Unusual circumstances
When Daniel was first tried, it resulted in a mistrial because one of the jurors believed Daniel to be completely innocent and voted for an acquittal. It was J.R. Wilhelm. Wilhelm was running for Scott County Sheriff at the time. He was elected before the sentencing would be carried out, and would be the forever known for placing a curse on Estiville for supposedly hanging an innocent man. The second trial resulted in a mistrial with some unusual occurrences. A witness was paid fifty dollars by a lawyer who was his uncle, if he would testify against Dean. When this became known, the uncle fled town and didn't return for over twenty-five years, leaving his nephew to be sentenced for three years for perjury.  The jury in the second trial could not reach a verdict. The court, fearing that the community was starting to take sides, sent for a jury from outside of the county. A jury was selected from Washington County and the case was tried in May 1878, almost a full year later.

Third trial
In the third trial, the prosecution presented several witnesses who testified that Dean told them that Fugate would "get what was coming to him". It was also revealed that Daniel Dean had borrowed a rifle from a neighbor named Francisco. Dean's own rifle was left at the Cleek Store (a gun shop at the time) in Estiville for repairs. The rifle that Dean borrowed was a large-bored rifle with a square barrel. This rifle would prove in court to be Dean's undoing. Police officers at that time examined where they believed the shot came from, and located what seemed to be a square indention on a rail.  Police felt that the shooter sat on the ground behind a bush, and rested the rifle on the fence rail to steady his aim. When the murderer fired the rifle it obviously jumped leaving the indention. When the Francisco gun was placed on this indention, it matched. The bullet pulled from Fugate's body had a similar weight to the bullet that the Francisco gun fired. When this gun was sent for by court officials, Dean swore that it would not shoot, because the trigger wouldn't stay cocked. Examination of the rifle proved that Dean had fired it and that the trigger was recently tampered with. Dean's two boys testified on his behalf. Both boys swore that they were with their father on Monday morning when Fugate was shot, and therefore he couldn't possibly be the murderer.

Verdict
All of the evidence that prosecutors presented was circumstantial. They said that Dean was within the area at the right time, and the right place. Also, he had the means, opportunity, and reason to commit the deed. On top of that he tried to escape. Patrick Hagan did everything that he could to save Daniel Dean. He gave an eight-hour speech in defense of Daniel, but to no avail. Dean was convicted totally on circumstantial evidence. When the sentence was handed down that Daniel was guilty, Patrick Hagan appealed it to the Virginia Supreme Court.

Appeal
The high court upheld the ruling of the county court and based Dean's conviction solely on circumstantial evidence. Patrick Hagan swore to the court to never be part of another criminal trial for the remainder of his life. J.R. Wilhelm, the juror from the first trial that voted for an acquittal, was now the county sheriff. He was given the order to carry out Daniel Dean's hanging, and he felt that Dean was innocent.

Controversy and public opinion
Half of the community did as well. Legend has it that he offered a deputy $300 if he would hang Daniel Dean. The deputy refused, believing that Dean was innocent as well. Wilhelm was distraught with the thought of hanging an innocent man. From the start, things went wrong. Rather than use a scaffold, the town chose to use a tree to carry out the sentence, so they could save money. The community was now so divided over the ruling, that they began to fight among themselves. When a rumor spread that several townspeople were going to break Daniel Dean out of jail, a mob formed and stormed the jail, hoping to hang Dean earlier than planned. Both sides took up arms.

Legend and sentencing
The hanging was not pleasant as far as hangings could go. Rather than go peacefully, Daniel Dean went kicking and screaming all the way, much to the horror of those present. Worse yet, Daniel's two boys were present and were screaming for their father. The crowd was also in an uproar because half were for the hanging, and the other half was against. Scott County was forced to borrow extra deputies from Washington County to keep the crowd back. Daniel professed his innocence right up to the moment that he was hanged. He was made to stand in the back of a wagon with a team of horses. Wilhelm stood with him in the wagon until the noose was around his neck. Dean sobbed as the minister read him his last rites, begging them not to do it. Then suddenly without warning Wilhelm jumped from the wagon into the driver's seat, grabbed the reins, and slapped the team of horses connected to the wagon. They lurched forward, and the deed was done. Wilhelm was so mad that before they could cut Daniel Dean down that he turned on the crowd. As tears of anger came from his eyes, he shouted that the town was filled with nothing but, "Yankee Demons from Hell", and that God would destroy them all. This comment would later be known as "The Curse of Estillville". Which would later result in the town changing its name. Some say that Wilhelm immediately left town and was never seen again; and that the office of sheriff remained vacant for over a year. Others say that he remained on, resigning in June 1880.

References
https://books.google.com/books?id=7fUaAAAAYAAJ&pg=PA918&lpg=PA918&dq=daniel+dean+case+scott+co+va&source=bl&ots=7g4-D52Jzm&sig=O4xb7-X-f60VIHcV2uRx_4cQo1E&hl=en&ei=4NifSpfSDdmL8Qar7JnnDw&sa=X&oi=book_result&ct=result&resnum=7#v=onepage&q=&f=false
http://www.newrivernotes.com/swva/hssv-11.htm#hsc
http://www.rootsweb.ancestry.com/~vaschs2/hanging_sheriffs.htm

Virginia state case law
1877 in United States case law
1877 in Virginia
Scott County, Virginia
Murder trials
United States evidence case law
United States murder case law
Law articles needing an infobox
1877 murders in the United States